Ukraine participated in the Junior Eurovision Song Contest 2019 in Gliwice, Poland with the song "The Spirit of Music" performed by Sophia Ivanko. Their entrant was selected through a national selection, organized by the Ukrainian broadcaster UA:PBC.

Background

In the 2018 contest, Darina Krasnovetska represented her country in Minsk, Belarus with the song "Say Love". She ended 4th out of 20 entries with 182 points.

Before Junior Eurovision

National final
The winner was determined by a seven-member jury formed of both representatives of Ukrainian television, as well as music industry professionals and announced on 19 August 2019. The jury panel that selected the winner consisted of: Oleksandra Koltsova (singer, member of the UA:PBC board), Alyosha (singer, represented Ukraine at the Eurovision Song Contest 2010), Adam (singer, composer), Tanya Sha (singer, composer), Oleksandr Stasov (composer), Oksana Shibinskaya (Head of Delegation of Ukraine in the Eurovision Song Contest) and Stanislav Medvedev (Head of Entertainment at UA:PBC). Together with the winner announcement, jury member Alyosha also announced the reasoning for the selection of Sophia Ivanko, stating: "We have decided that Sofia Ivanko would be the best representative of Ukraine at the Junior Eurovision Song Contest this year. Why? Because she very much stands out from other participants, she is very special, she has her specific, very expressively emotional character, she is mysterious and there is something about her, not characteristic of other people or other participants. The song needs a little more extra work, and then it will be very cool material, a cool song. I hope that Ukraine’s entry will be highly appreciated not only here, in this room, but also all over the world".

At Junior Eurovision
During the opening ceremony and the running order draw which both took place on 18 November 2019, Ukraine was drawn to perform thirteenth on 24 November 2019, following Ireland and preceding Netherlands.

Voting

Detailed voting results

References

Junior Eurovision Song Contest
Ukraine
2019